The Surre, is a Somali clan, a sub clan of the major Somali Dir clans, The Surre inhabit in central and southern Somalia. And also can be found in Somaliland, Ethiopia and Kenya.

History

The Surre have been associated with spreading the Islamic faith in Somalia and the Qadiriya Sufi tariiqa in central and southern Somalia. They left what is now Somaliland in approximately 1316 C.E. for central and southern Somalia.

The majority of the western scholars (both Italian and British) simply referred to the Surre as the "Dir of Puntland and Southcentral Somalia" without differentiating them, but recent studies in Somalia revealed that the Dir in Nugal, Mudug, Galgaduud, Hiran, and Gedo are divided into two branches, the Qubeys and the Abdalle, both descendants of Surre.

 the Surre were represented by the Southern Somali National Movement led by Abdi Aziz Sheikh Yusuf.

Distribution

Mainly Qubeys and Abdalles with Mohamed Gutale (Habardeel) the uncle of Abdalle are the Surre subclans. The Saleban Abdalle clan is mainly local to Puntland, especially in the regions of Nugal and Mudug and predominantly inhabit Tawfiiq District, Dahraan neighborhood of Galkayo of Mudug and Godobjiran of Nugaal and have a sizable presence in Bosaso.

Another cluster of Abdalle clan of mainly Fiqi Mohamad reside from Herale district of Galgaduud region in Galmudug State through defow of Hirshabelle State parallel to the Ethio-Somali border all the way to the north of Jubba river in Gedo region of Jubaland state mainly in Boholgaras and towns surrounding it divided by the Ethiopian border there, the Fiqi Mohamad and Nacdoor of Abdalle predominantly inhabit Dolobay Woreda, with significant population in Chereti (woreda) both in Afder Zone  and Jijiga the capital of the Somali state.

The Qubeys Clan is mainly native to Bacadweyne district  as well as many towns under its jurisdiction and in Galkayo in Mudug region of Galmudug State, the Fiqi  Qubeys also reside Tawfiiq and areas around it along with their Abdalle brothers, Mirjiicley town of Herale district and in Kabxanley and  towns in Hirshabelle State. The Surre have a sizable presence in both the capital Mogadishu and Lower Shabelle where the qubeys resides the town of Golweyn and have a significant presence in Merca.

A sub subclan of Surre also inhabit the Sanaag region of Somaliland, with the Cabaas Muuse sub subclan being present in Badhan District.

Clan tree

 Dir
 Mehe
Surre
Qubeys 
 
 Mohamed Abti Udug
 Fiqi Umar
 Fiqi Yahye
Ahadowe
 Abdalle Diidshe
 Ismaan Diidshe
Midkase 
 (ahmed farah)
Guutaale
Mohamed (Habardeel) 
Abdalle
Mohamed Abdalle (Nacdoor) 
Yusuf Abdalle (Gorod) 
Abdi Abdalle
Fiqi Mohamed
Saleban Abdalle

Y-DNA

DNA analysis of Dir clan members inhabiting Djibouti found that all of the individuals belonged to the Y-DNA T1 paternal haplogroup and in Dire Dawa 82% a city in Ethiopia with a majority Dir population. All genetic analysis carried out on the Surre male clan members have so far shown that they exclusively belong to the T1 paternal haplogroup.

Notable members 

1. Mahad Abdalle Awad - current second deputy speaker of the Federal Parliament of Somalia 
2. Qamar Aden Ali - Late former Somali minister of Health
3.Duniyo Mohamed Ali -Federal Parliament Of Somalia 
4. Abdikarim Yusuf Adam(dhagabadan) - Late former Army Chief of staff Somali Armed Forced 
5. Gen Abdalla Abdalla - former NISA deputy director
6. Abdi Aziz SHeikh Yusuf Direed - Prominent Somali politician
7. Abdukdir Noor Hussein Maah - Renowned Somali author novelist
8. Zakia Hussein - A politician and current deputy police of Somalia
9. Ahmed Ali Dahir - Former and long serving general attorney of Somalia
10. Seynab laba dhagah - Current politician and a former artist
11. Abdulahi Abuukar Haji - Current Somali minister of education and higher studies
12.Sheikh ibrahim Suley - well known Somali Islamic scholar
13.Khalif Moalim Hussein - Somali Businessman and a well known statesman. 
14.Sheikh Salah moalim abdullahi - Islamic scholar
15.Jeylani ALi  - Somali Businessman and a former politician
16.Ali Hared Ali -Former 1st deputy speaker of galmudug local government

References

Somali clans